Ancus may refer to:
 Ancus (beetle), a genus of beetles in the family Carabidae
 Ancus Marcius (7th century BC), king of Rome
 14088 Ancus, an asteroid
 Ancus, an Italic praenomen
 A part of a male Lepidoptera genitalia

See also
 Ankus, a tool employed in the handling and training of elephants